The Ceilidh Trail is a scenic roadway in the Canadian province of Nova Scotia.

This coastal route along the Gulf of St. Lawrence is located on the west coast of Cape Breton Island in Inverness County and runs  from the Canso Causeway in Port Hastings to Margaree Harbor where it intersects with the Cabot Trail.

The region's Scottish heritage dates back to the beginning of the 19th century. Cèilidh means "party".

Routes
Trunk 19
Route 219

Communities
Inverness, home of the Ceilidh Trail School of Celtic Music
the Mabou Highlands
Lake Ainslie, the largest natural fresh water lake on Cape Breton Island
Judique
Port Hood

References

External links
 Marconi Trail - Accommodations & Restaurants

Scenic travelways in Nova Scotia
Roads in Inverness County, Nova Scotia